Sir Last Chance is a 2009 Sri Lankan Sinhala comedy film directed by Roy de Silva and produced by Soma Edirisinghe for EAP Films. It stars Vijaya Nandasiri, Sanath Wimalasiri and Lucky Dias in lead roles along with Anarkali Akarsha and Palitha Silva. Music co-composed by Rohana Weerasinghe and Sangeeth Wickramasinghe. It is the first DTS cinemascope digital comedy film made in Sri Lanka as well. It is the 1122nd Sri Lankan film in the Sinhala cinema.

Plot
The story begins with the members of the private detective office lead by Detective Last Chance. The office consists 6 male detectives and 5 female detectives. Meanwhile, Mister Producer decides to recruit two Bollywood actresses for his latest film production due to force from his wife and daughter. Later he revealed that the film can earn good income as well. With that, Sri Lankan movie stars strongly protest against Bollywood actresses and make plans to kidnap the two foreign actresses with the help of Don Ladan. Mister Producer reveals the story of kidnap and he ask help from Detective Chance. The Detective selected two of his best men Arti and Viti to protect two actresses. The two detective safely bring two actresses to their home. Arti and Viti dressed up as two actresses and start to act like them. Meanwhile, Sri Lankan stars seek to kidnap fake actresses and make muhurath ceremony a funny act. However, after series of incidents, Ladan kidnap two fake actresses and demand a ransom of Rs. 50 million dollars, for their release. However, Arti and Viti reveal their actual appearance and catch all the gangs with the help of fellow detective and Sri Lanka stars, who later realized their mistakes. Finally, at the contract sign, two real Bollywood actresses reveal their presence and they ask to do the film with your own film stars. Arti and Viti had a ceremony and gifted with medals for the contribution. Finally Arti ask Detective Chance to give permission to marry his fiancée and detective gives the permission.

Cast
 Vijaya Nandasiri as Detective Last Chance
 Lucky Dias as Mister Producer
 Palitha Silva as Don Ladan aka George Washingpowder
 Arjuna Kamalanath as Arjun
 Sanath Wimalasiri as Arti
 Anura Pathirana as Viti
 Anusha Damayanthi as Anu
 Nilanthi Dias as Sarojini
 Janesh Silva as Detective
 Chathura Perera as Detective
 Anarkali Akarsha as Arti's fiancée
 Rodney Warnakula as Detective
 Priyantha Seneviratne as Detective
 Anton Jude as Detective
 Mahinda Pathirage as Detective
 Teddy Vidyalankara as Ladan's henchman
 Sumana Amarasinghe

Soundtrack

References

2009 films
2000s Sinhala-language films
2009 comedy films
Sri Lankan comedy films